Luke Bell (January 27, 1990 – August 26, 2022) was an American country musician and singer-songwriter. According to Rolling Stone, Bell "[played] classic honky-tonk with a wink and a yodel that summons the sleeping ghosts of country better than any voodoo spell ever could".

Early life
Bell was born in Lexington, Kentucky, and raised in Cody, Wyoming. He attended Cody High School, graduating in 2008. Bell briefly attended college in Laramie, Wyoming, before dropping out.

Career

Debut self-titled album
Bell moved to Austin, Texas, in 2012 where he recorded his self-titled debut album. Bell also produced the entire album himself.

Don't Mind If I Do
Bell moved to New Orleans briefly, where he spent his time busking on the street to make money. Afterwards, he moved back to Cody, Wyoming, where he wrote and recorded his second full-length album, titled Don't Mind If I Do. He wrote the album while working on a ranch, and recorded it upon receiving funding from a Kickstarter campaign. 

Bell enlisted Andrija Tokic, who had worked with Caitlin Rose, Alabama Shakes, and Hurray for the Riff Raff previously, to produce the album. He recorded a Daytrotter session that same year. According to Daytrotter, the people whom Bell writes about "have bigger than life personalities" and "Bell is, without a doubt, one of the most talented country and western songwriters working ..."

Final album
After the second record era was complete, Bell moved to Nashville, Tennessee. He released his second self-titled and third and final studio album in 2016. The album was a mix of songs from his previous album and new songs. 

"Sometimes", a single from the album that was originally on Bell's 2014 release, received attention from both NPR Music and Rolling Stone. A music video featuring Erin Rae, Patrick Sweany, and Kristina Murray was released for the song. In late 2016, Bell released a cover of the 1971 John Lennon song "Jealous Guy".

Death
While in Tucson, Arizona, Bell disappeared on August 20, 2022, while his friend went out to eat. He was found dead in Tucson nine days later, not far from where he disappeared, aged 32. Bell suffered from severe bipolar disorder and had recently changed medication for treatment prior to his death. 

His family released a statement a few days later confirming his bipolar disorder contributed to his death. However, they did not give a specific cause of his death. On September 18, 2022, the Pima County Medical Examiner's Office announced that Bell had died from fentanyl intoxication on August 26.

Discography
Source(s):

Studio albums
Luke Bell (2012)
Don't Mind If I Do (2014)
Luke Bell (2016)

Singles
 "Where Ya Been?" (2017)
 "Jealous Guy" (2021)

Music videos

See also
List of solved missing person cases

References

External links 
 
 

1990 births
2022 deaths
2020s missing person cases
21st-century American male singers
21st-century American singers
Accidental deaths in Arizona
American country singer-songwriters
Country musicians from Wyoming
Drug-related deaths in Arizona
Formerly missing people
Missing person cases in Arizona
Musicians from Lexington, Kentucky
People from Cody, Wyoming
People with bipolar disorder
Singer-songwriters from Wyoming
Thirty Tigers artists